Bitsch railway station is a railway station in the municipality of Bitsch, in the Swiss canton of Valais. It is an intermediate stop on the  gauge Furka Oberalp line of the Matterhorn Gotthard Bahn and is served by local trains only.

Services 
The following services stop at Bitsch:

 Regio:

References

External links 
 
 

Railway stations in the canton of Valais
Matterhorn Gotthard Bahn stations